The canton of Le Sud-Médoc is an administrative division of the Gironde department, southwestern France. It was created at the French canton reorganisation which came into effect in March 2015. Its seat is in Lacanau.

It consists of the following communes:
 
Arcins
Arsac
Avensan
Brach
Carcans
Castelnau-de-Médoc
Cussac-Fort-Médoc
Hourtin
Labarde
Lacanau
Lamarque
Listrac-Médoc
Macau
Margaux-Cantenac
Moulis-en-Médoc
Le Porge
Sainte-Hélène
Saint-Laurent-Médoc
Salaunes
Saumos
Soussans
Le Temple

References

Cantons of Gironde